The 2002 Mountain West Conference baseball tournament took place from May 22 through 25. All six of the league's teams met in the double-elimination tournament held at Brigham Young University's Larry H. Miller Field. Top seeded BYU won their second consecutive and second overall Mountain West Conference Baseball Championship with a championship game score of 14–9 and earned the conference's automatic bid to the 2002 NCAA Division I baseball tournament.

Seeding 
The teams were seeded based on regular season conference winning percentage only.

Results

All-Tournament Team 
The following teams were named to the All-Tournament team.

Most Valuable Player 
Doug Jackson, an outfielder for the champion BYU Cougars, was named the tournament Most Valuable Player.

References 

Tournament
Mountain West Conference baseball tournament
Mountain West Conference baseball tournament
Mountain West Conference baseball tournament